Renouard is a surname. Notable people with the surname include:

Antoine-Augustin Renouard (1765–1853), French industrialist and bibliographer
George Cecil Renouard (1780–1867), English classical and oriental scholar
Jean-Jacques Renouard de Villayer (1607–1691), French official
Jean-Pierre Renouard (1922–2014), French writer
Maël Renouard (1833–1910), French financier
Maël Renouard (born 1979), French writer and translator
Philippe Renouard (1862–1934), French bookseller and bibliographer
Sébastien Renouard (born 1984), French football player